”Queen Mary's Song” is a song written by the English composer Edward Elgar in 1889.  The words are from Lute Song by Tennyson.

It was composed between 14 June and 1 July 1889, and dedicated to 'J. H. Meredith'.

The song was first published by Orsborn & Tuckwood in 1889, then by Ascherberg in 1892.  It was re-published in 1907 as one of the Seven Lieder of Edward Elgar, with English and German words.

Lyrics

German words by Ed. Sachs

Recordings

Songs and Piano Music by Edward Elgar has "Queen Mary's Song" performed by Amanda Pitt (soprano), with David Owen Norris (piano).
Elgar: Complete Songs for Voice & Piano Konrad Jarnot (baritone), Reinild Mees (piano)
The Songs of Edward Elgar SOMM CD 220 Catherine Wyn-Rogers (soprano) with Malcolm Martineau (piano), at Southlands College, London, April 1999

References

Banfield, Stephen, Sensibility and English Song: Critical studies of the early 20th century (Cambridge University Press, 1985) 
Kennedy, Michael, Portrait of Elgar (Oxford University Press, 1968) 
Moore, Jerrold N. “Edward Elgar: a creative life” (Oxford University Press, 1984)

External links

Notes

Songs by Edward Elgar
1889 songs
Mary, Queen of Scots